Richard T. Bradstreet is an American politician and businessman serving as a member of the Maine House of Representatives from the 80th district. He assumed office in 2016.

Early life and education 
Bradstreet is a native of Vassalboro, Maine. He earned a Bachelor of Arts degree in sociology from Dartmouth College in 1973.

Career 
From 1973 to 2015, Bradstreet was the owner and president of Bradstreet Homes. He was elected to the Maine House of Representatives in 2016. Since 2019, he has been the ranking member of the House Labor and Housing Committee.

Personal life 
Bradstreet and his wife, JoAnne, have three children. His daughter, Amy Arata, is also a member of the Maine House of Representatives.

References 

Year of birth missing (living people)
Living people
Republican Party members of the Maine House of Representatives
People from Vassalboro, Maine
Dartmouth College alumni